Edward Simon (born July 27, 1969) is a Venezuelan jazz pianist and composer.

Early life
Simon was born in Punta Cardón, Venezuela. When he was ten years old, he went to the United States of America to study at the Performing Arts School in Philadelphia. After graduating, he attended the University of the Arts in Philadelphia, where he studied classical piano, then the Manhattan School of Music, where he studied jazz piano.

Later life and career
In 1988, he recorded as a sideman with Greg Osby, then worked as a member of the band Horizon led by Bobby Watson. For the next eight years he was a member of Terence Blanchard's band. He has also worked with Herbie Mann, Paquito D'Rivera, Bobby Hutcherson, Jerry Gonzalez, John Patitucci, Arturo Sandoval, Manny Oquendo, and Don Byron. 
Simon recorded Beauty Within (AudioQuest, 1994), his first album as a bandleader, with Horacio Hernández and bass guitarist Anthony Jackson. During the same year, he was a finalist in the Thelonious Monk International Jazz Piano Competition. Then the following year he composed Rumba Neurotica for the Relache Ensemble.

He formed Ensemble Venezuela in 2003 to combine jazz with the music of Venezuela. He was given a commission by Chamber Music America to write "Venezuelan Suite". He recorded the album in 2012 with musicians from Venezuela, Colombia, and the U.S.  

Simon has played on several Grammy-nominated jazz albums. Besides his trio he leads the Sexteto Venezuela, the Afinidad Quartet, and the group Simon, Simon, & Simon with his brothers. He has taught at the New School for Jazz and Contemporary Music in New York City and has been artist in residence at Western Michigan University.

Discography

As leader

As sideman 
With Craig Handy
Split Second Timing (Arabesque, 1992) – recorded in 1991

With Greg Osby
 Mindgames (JMT, 1988)
 Season of Renewal (JMT, 1990) – recorded in 1989

With Terence Blanchard
 1994: Romantic Defiance (Columbia, 1995)
 1995: The Heart Speaks (Columbia, 1996)
 1999: Wandering Moon (Sony Classical, 2000)
 2001: Let's Get Lost (Sony Classical, 2001)

References

External links
 Official site

1969 births
Living people
Venezuelan jazz musicians
SFJAZZ Collective members
Sunnyside Records artists
Criss Cross Jazz artists
Red Records artists
CAM Jazz artists